William Caine may refer to:

 William Caine (Hong Kong) (1799–1871), Colonial Secretary and acting Governor of Hong Kong
 William Sproston Caine (1842–1903), British politician and Temperance advocate
 William Caine (author) (1873–1925), British novelist
 L. William Caine, college football coach

See also
William Cain (disambiguation)
William Kane (disambiguation)
Caine (surname)